Issah may refer to:

Issah Abass (born 1998), Ghanaian professional footballer
Issah Gabriel Ahmed (born 1982), Ghanaian former professional footballer
Fuseini Issah(born 1975), Ghanaian politician and member of parliament
Kamal Issah (born 1992), Ghanaian professional footballer
Mohammed-Awal Issah (born 1986), Ghanaian former professional footballer
Issah Mmari (1981–2003), better known by his stage name E-Sir, Kenyan hip hop artist
Issah Moro (born 1974), Ghanaian retired football forward
Issah Samir (born 1989), Ghanaian boxer who qualified for the 2008 Summer Olympics
Issah Yakubu (born 1992), Ghanaian professional footballer